Philip (or Phillip) Barker may refer to:

 Philip A. Barker (1920–2001), British archaeologist
 Phillip Barker (film director), Canadian film director
 Philip Barker-Webb (1793–1854), English botanist
 Phil Barker (born 1932), British war games designer and pioneer
 M. A. R. Barker (Phillip Barker, 1929–2012), American professor of Urdu and South Asian Studies

 Phil Barker, British professor, creator of the Tidal Model